DUSTWUN (abbreviation for duty status—whereabouts unknown) is a transitory casualty status assigned to United States service members who cannot be located but have not been confirmed dead or captured.  A service member can have DUSTWUN status for only ten days.

History
U.S. soldier Bowe Bergdahl came to national attention in the United States after spending five years in captivity in Afghanistan; he had left his post in 2009 intending to hike 20 miles to the closest command center when he was captured by the Taliban.  His disappearance triggered an unsuccessful 45-day "DUSTWUN" manhunt by the U.S. Army.

See also 
Missing in action

Notes

Military terminology of the United States
War casualties